The Irish Tag Rugby Association, also known as ITRA, is the official founding body of adult Tag Rugby in Ireland.

History 
ITRA was founded in 2000 and since then it has organized nationwide tag rugby summer leagues. In 2003 weekend blitz's were introduced, with the addition of spring leagues in 2005.

External links 
Irish Tag Rugby Association

Rugby union governing bodies in Ireland